Centropodieae is a tribe of grasses containing only two genera. It is the earliest-branching lineage in the subfamily Chloridoideae and contains its only genus with C3 species, Ellisochloa, while all other species in the tribe and subfamily use the C4 photosynthetic pathway.

References

Chloridoideae
Poaceae tribes